The Schächentaler Windgällen is a mountain massif in the Schwyzer Alps, overlooking Unterschächen in the canton of Uri. The two named peaks are Höch Windgällen (2764 m) and Läged Windgällen (2572 m). The mountain massif lies between the valley of Muotathal (north) and Schächental (south). The Schächentaler Windgällen are located a few kilometres west of Klausen Pass.

The normal route to the summit goes along the south-east ridge. No official trail leads to the top, but the easiest route is marked with yellow dots over its last part.

References

External links
Schächentaler Windgällen on Summitpost
Schächentaler Windgällen on Hikr

Mountains of the Alps
Mountains of Switzerland
Mountains of the canton of Uri